Christopher Warren Morris (born June 7, 1949) is professor and chair of philosophy at the University of Maryland, where he is also a member of the Faculty of Politics, Philosophy, and Public Policy.

His main research areas are moral, legal and political philosophy as well as practical rationality.

Early life 
Morris gained his psychology and philosophy degree from Vassar College, Poughkeepsie, New York in 1971, he went on to University of Toronto to do both his philosophy master's (1974) and his philosophy doctorate (1977).

Academic career 
From 1977 to 1982 he was the assistant professor of philosophy at the University of Ottawa. Morris then spent a number of years as a visiting lecturer at a number of universities. In 1986 he took up a position as associate professor of philosophy at Bowling Green State University (BGSU), he was made senior research fellow of BGSU's Social Philosophy & Policy Center in 1990, and from 1994 until he left in 2001 to go to the University of Maryland, he was their professor of philosophy.

Selected bibliography

PhD thesis 
  OCLC number 15826837

Books 
  translated into Portuguese as -

Chapters in books

Journal articles

References

External links 
 Profile: Christopher W. Morris Professor & Chair, University of Maryland

21st-century Canadian philosophers
Bowling Green State University faculty
University of Maryland, College Park faculty
University of Toronto alumni
Vassar College alumni
1949 births
Living people
Place of birth missing (living people)